Dabija or Dabizha may refer to:

 Alexandru Dabija (born 1955), Romanian stage director and actor
 Eustratie Dabija, Prince (Voivode) of Moldavia 1661–1665
 Elena Dabija, librarian and activist from Moldova
 George Bengescu-Dabija (1844–1916), Wallachian, later Romanian poet, playwright and army general
 Nicolae Dabija (politician) (born 1948), writer, literary historian and politician from Moldova
 Nicolae Dabija (soldier) (1907–1949), officer of the Romanian Royal Army and member of the anticommunist armed resistance in Romania
 Nataliya Dabizha (b. 1948), Russian animator and animation director

Romanian-language surnames